William Sherrerd Barker (born July 3, 1987) is a former American football offensive tackle who played in the National Football League. He was signed by the Dallas Cowboys as an undrafted free agent in 2010. He played college football at Virginia.

Early life
Barker grew up in Bryn Mawr, Pennsylvania, a suburban community outside of Philadelphia, with his two sisters, Lila and Lexie. He attended The Haverford School. Despite focusing on football, he also excelled in lacrosse where he started on defense for Haverford's nationally ranked team.

College career
Barker played at the University of Virginia. He earned Second-team Freshman All-American during his freshman season by the Sporting News. He was named team captain as a senior.

Professional career

Dallas Cowboys
After going undrafted in the 2010 NFL Draft, Barker signed as a free agent with the Dallas Cowboys on April 24, 2010.

Tampa Bay Buccaneers
Barker signed to Tampa Bay's practice squad after being cut by Dallas, and was activated later in the season. He was waived during final cuts on September 3, 2011, and re-signed to the Buccaneers' practice squad two days later.

Miami Dolphins
Barker was signed off the Buccaneers' practice squad on October 5, 2011. He was released by the Dolphins on September 1, 2012.

References

External links
 Virginia Cavaliers bio
 Tampa Bay Buccaneers bio

1987 births
Living people
American football offensive tackles
Virginia Cavaliers football players
Dallas Cowboys players
Tampa Bay Buccaneers players
Haverford School alumni
Miami Dolphins players